The 1918 Detroit Heralds season was the 14th season for the Detroit Heralds, an independent American football team. Led by coach Bill Marshall, the team compiled a 6–2 record. Fullback Pat Dunne was the team captain.

Schedule

Players
 Brazell, halfback/end (possibly N.J. Brazell who played halfback for Michigan in 1916)
 Collard, end
 Walter "Red" Cullen, quarterback
 Davis, tackle
 Tom Dickinson, end
 Pat Dunne, fullback
 Hanish, halfback/end (possibly Joseph Hanish who played halfback for Michigan 1916-1917)
 "Red" Harwood, guard/tackle
 Holden, tackle
 Johnson, halfback
 Kelly/Kelley, halfback (possibly Jimmy Kelly who played halfback for the Detroit Titans in 1917)
 Ty Krentler, end/halfback/quarterback
 Martin, tackle
 Mitchell, end
 Dan Mullane, end
 Gil Runkel, center
 Schlee, tackle
 Shanahan, end
 Guy Shields, guard
 Lou Usher, tackle
 Tillie Voss, tackle
 "Dutch" Wein, quarterback
 Young, tackle

References 

Detroit Heralds seasons
Detroit Heralds